Levon Davidian (24 March 1944 in Hamadan – 15 July 2009), an Iranian-Armenian politician, was an Iranian parliament member. He was a psychiatrist and professor of university. He died when Caspian Airlines Flight 7908 crashed killing all passengers on board.

Publications
 Handbook of Psychiatry (30 Volumes), volume Four

References

See also

Reserved Majlis seats

1944 births
2009 deaths
Ethnic Armenian politicians
Iranian people of Armenian descent
Iranian Christians
Iranian psychiatrists
Members of the 6th Islamic Consultative Assembly
People from Hamadan
Tehran Armenians and North of Iran Representatives in Islamic Consultative Assembly
Victims of aviation accidents or incidents in Iran
20th-century Iranian people
21st-century Iranian people